Henry Browne may refer to:

Henry Browne, Farmer, a 1942 film about African-American contributions to the American home front in World War II
Henry Browne (scholar) (1804–1875), English classical and biblical scholar
Henry Gore-Browne (1830–1912), Irish recipient of the Victoria Cross
Henry Cave-Browne-Cave (1887–1965), Royal Naval Air Service and Royal Air Force officer
Henry Browne, 5th Marquess of Sligo (1831–1913), Irish peer
Henry Browne (Archdeacon of Ely) (1780–1858), Anglican priest

See also
Henry Browne Blackwell (1825–1909), American social reformer
Henry Browne Hayes (1762–1832), Irish-born convict
John Henry Browne (born 1946), American criminal defense attorney
Henry Brown (disambiguation)
Harry Browne (1933–2006), American writer, politician, and investment advisor